Alternative Matter is a compilation album by the UK band Antimatter.

Track listing
DISC ONE

DISC TWO

DISC THREE - 'FORBIDDEN MATTER E.P.' (Limited Edition Artbook Only)

DISC FOUR - DVD (Limited Edition Artbook Only)

Credits
Music and lyrics: Mick Moss, Duncan Patterson
Guest appearances: Danny Cavanagh, Colin Fromont, Rachel Brewster, Chris Phillips, Lisa Cuthbert, Jenny O'Connor, Amber-Page Moss, Mark Hughes, Ste Hughes, Łukasz Langa, Cláudia Andrade
Artwork: Concept by Duncan Patterson and Mick Moss, from an original image by Bill Purcell, NASA

External links 

 Official site

2010 compilation albums
Antimatter (band) albums